San Francisco is a municipality in the metropolitan area of Maracaibo, Venezuela's second largest city.

Geography
San Francisco is situated on the Maracaibo Plain on the west shore of Tablazo Strait, which connects Lake Maracaibo with the Caribbean Sea. It borders the municipalities of Maracaibo to the north, Jesús Enrique Lossada to the west, and La Cañada de Urdaneta to the south.

San Francisco has a semi-arid climate, with an average annual temperature of 27.8 °C and annual rainfall of 700 mm.

History
In his 1830 atlas of Venezuela, Agustín Codazzi recorded a Punta de San Francisco located between the towns of Maracaibo and La Cañada. San Francisco was first officially recorded as the name of a parroquia in 1881. The current municipality was created on 22 January 1995 from the parroquias of San Francisco, Francisco Ochoa, Marcial Hernandez, and Domitila Flores, all previously part of the municipality of Maracaibo.

Government
The following people have served as mayor (alcalde) of San Francisco: 
Saady Bijani, 1995–2008
Omar Prieto, 2008–2017
Dirwings Arrieta, 2017–2021

Subdivisions

San Francisco is divided into seven parroquias, of which San Francisco serves as the capital of the municipality. The newest parroquia is José Domingo Rus, which was created in 2006.

Economy
San Francisco is highly urbanized and its economy is sustained by secondary and tertiary activities. Major industries include coal, oil, cement, and fish processing.

Infrastructure
 

San Francisco is the western terminus of the Troncal 3 highway, which crosses the Tablazo Strait over the General Rafael Urdaneta Bridge and connects Maracaibo to Coro, the capital of Falcón, and the town of Morón in Carabobo. San Francisco also lies on the Troncal 6 highway, which runs north-south through Zulia from the border crossing to Colombia at Paraguachón to La Fría in Táchira.

Intercity buses stop at the Simón Bolívar bus terminal at the interchange of Troncal 3 with Avenida 5. The bus terminal is also the terminus of a circular bus route which serves San Francisco and is operated by Maracaibo's Metromara bus system.

La Chinita International Airport, which serves the Maracaibo area, is located in San Francisco.

The municipality has two hospitals.

Recreational areas in San Francisco include the Zulia Metropolitan Zoo and a botanical garden.

References

External links

Municipalities of Zulia
1995 establishments in Venezuela